The eighth series of the British sitcom series 'Allo 'Allo! contains a Christmas special which aired on 24 December 1991, and seven regular episodes which first aired between 12 January and 1 March 1992, and repeated between 14 September and 2 November 1992 when the 9th and final series started on 9 November of that year.

Series 8 marks a change in the series. Rather than continuing to tell the story from the end of the seventh series, the first episode picks up the story some two years later. This sees the departure of the two British airmen and Bertorelli from the series. John B. Hobbs became the producer for the show.

In this series the letters in the initial credits were yellow instead of white like all earlier series. Secondly, there was no exclamation mark, when the title "'Allo 'Allo" was shown on screen.

The following episode names are the ones found on the British R2 DVDs with alternate region titles given below them.

Episodes

References

1991 British television seasons
1992 British television seasons
 8
'Allo 'Allo! seasons